Tătaru is a Romanian surname that may refer to:
 Daniel Tătaru  (born 1967), Romanian mathematician
 Gheorghe Tătaru (1948–2004), Romanian football striker
 Ionuț Tătaru (born 1989), Romanian footballer
 Nelu Tătaru (born 1972), Romanian politician

Romanian-language surnames